Godepert (also Gundipert, Godebert, Godipert, Godpert, Gotebert, Gotbert, Gotpert, Gosbert, or Gottbert) was king of the Lombards (crowned 661), eldest son and successor of Aripert I.  He was an Arian who governed from the ancient capital, Pavia, while his brother, Perctarit, a Roman Catholic, governed from Milan.  In a war with his brother, he beckoned Duke Grimoald I of Benevento, who assassinated him in his Pavian palace, the Reggia. Godepert's son Raginpert managed to escape and would later rule, but first, Grimoald would seize the throne. He was buried in the Basilica of Santissimo Salvatore in Pavia.

References

662 deaths
7th-century Lombard monarchs
7th-century Arian Christians
7th-century murdered monarchs
Bavarian dynasty
Year of birth unknown